Clear Grit is a ghost town in Carrolton Township, Fillmore County, in the U.S. state of Minnesota.

History
Clear Grit was founded as a mill town on the South branch of the Root River. A post office was established at Clear Grit in 1878, but it only lasted until 1882. The former community is part of the Old Barn Resort.

References

Former populated places in Fillmore County, Minnesota
Ghost towns in Minnesota